Vadim Svyatoslavovich Sinyavsky (August 10, 1906, Smolensk —  July 3, 1972, Moscow) was a Soviet sports journalist and sports commentator, the founder of the Soviet school of sports radio reporting.

References

External links

 Vadim Sinyavsky // Great Soviet Encyclopedia  —  3rd ed. —  M.: Soviet Encyclopedia, 1969.
 Репортаж вёл Вадим Синявский // Rossiyskaya Gazeta

1906 births
1972 deaths
People from Smolensk
Soviet sports journalists
Soviet war correspondents
Soviet male voice actors
Recipients of the Order of the Red Banner
Recipients of the Order of the Red Star
Recipients of the Order of the Red Banner of Labour
Russian association football commentators
Burials at Donskoye Cemetery
Communist Party of the Soviet Union members